The Swimsuit Issue is a 2008 Swedish film directed by Måns Herngren.

Plot 
Fredrik discovers synchronised swimming and recruits some friends to compete in an international competition for men.

Cast 
Jonas Inde as Fredrik
Amanda Davin as Sara
Andreas Rothlin-Svensson as Charles
Jimmy Lindström as Larry
Peter Gardiner as Victor
Benny Haag as Peter
Shebly Niavarani as Börje
Kalle Westerdahl as Markus
Maria Langhammer as Lillemor

References

External links 

2000s sports comedy films
2008 comedy films
2008 films
Swedish sports comedy films
2000s Swedish-language films
Swimming films
2000s Swedish films